The Adidas Fevernova is a football manufactured by German corporation Adidas. It was the official match ball of the 2002 FIFA World Cup held in South Korea and Japan and 2003 FIFA Women's World Cup held in United States. Its styling marked a departure from the traditional Tango ball design.

The ball was composed of 11 layers and was 3-mm thick, including a special foam layer with gas filled balloon imbedded in a syntactic foram. The outer cover was made from a combination of polyurethane and rubber.

History 
The Fevernova's colouring parted from the Tango's style of three-pointed shapes connecting each hexagon, instead introducing a different, triangle-like shape on four hexagons. This colourful and revolutionary look and colour usage was entirely based on Asian culture (the dark gold trigon resembles a tomoe and the red streaks on its angles resemble calligraphy brush strokes). It also featured a refined syntactic foam layer, to give the ball superior performance characteristics, and a three-layer knitted chassis, allowing for a more precise and predictable flight path.

This ball was notoriously criticised for being too light, yet some spectacular goals were scored with it during the tournament. The ball was also blamed for a number of upsets that happened in the knockout stages.

This ball used in home match 2002–03 Bundesliga for clubs Bayer 04 Leverkusen, Bayern Munich, Hansa Rostock, 1. FC Nürnberg and Schalke 04.

A new version of the ball was manufactured for the 2003 FIFA Women's World Cup.

This ball used in home match 2003–04 Bundesliga for clubs Bayer 04 Leverkusen, SC Freiburg, Bayern Munich, Hansa Rostock and Schalke 04.

It was also used in the 2004 Summer Paralympics and the 2004 African Cup of Nations.

References

Fevernova
Fevernova
Products introduced in 2002